Charles Joseph Angus  (born November 14, 1962) is a Canadian author, journalist, broadcaster, musician and politician. A member of the New Democratic Party (NDP), Angus has been the federal Member of Parliament for the riding of Timmins—James Bay since winning the 2004 election. He is the NDP critic for Ethics, Federal Economic Development, Initiative for Northern Ontario, Indigenous Youth, Income Inequality and Affordability, and Deputy Critic for Labour. 

Angus was a candidate for leadership of the federal NDP in the 2017 election, where he received 19.4% of the vote.

He is the author of Cobalt: Cradle of the Demon Metals, Birth of a Mining Superpower.

Early life, music, writing, and activism
Angus was born in Timmins, Ontario, and moved to Toronto in 1973, where in 1980 he co-founded the punk rock band L'Étranger with childhood friend Andrew Cash. Angus performed bass and co-wrote many of the group's songs, which were influenced by the Clash and the group's Catholic social justice roots. L'Étranger is best known for their anti-apartheid single "One People", one of the first independent videos to play on the then-new MuchMusic. Angus later co-founded the alternative folk group Grievous Angels. He continues to perform with the group on occasion, and released a new album in 2021.

Angus was a community activist in Toronto in the 1980s where, along with his wife Brit Griffin, he established a Catholic Worker house and a homeless shelter for men. He moved to Cobalt, Ontario, with his young family in 1990, and in 1995 Brit and Charlie launched HighGrader, a magazine devoted to Northern Ontario life and culture.  In 1999, he received an award from the Northern Lights Festival Boréal in Sudbury for his outstanding contributions to Northern Ontario culture.

He is the author of seven published books, including an admiring biography of Les Costello, the celebrated Toronto Maple Leafs player who left professional hockey to become a Catholic priest in Timmins. Angus's fifth book, Cage Call, a photo documentary with photographer Louie Palu, was released in 2007.

Angus is a progressive, social justice–oriented member of the Roman Catholic Church, a supporter of the Catholic Worker Movement, and was a longtime columnist for the progressive Catholic New Times. He became increasingly involved in regional and then federal politics through his organizing efforts in opposition to the Adams Mine garbage proposal and the disposal of PCBs in Northern Ontario.

From 2000 to 2004, Angus served as a trustee on the Northeastern Catholic District School Board.

Federal politics

Angus entered federal politics in the 2004 election as the successful New Democratic Party candidate in the Ontario riding of Timmins—James Bay, winning election to the House of Commons of Canada by less than 600 votes. He was re-elected in the 2006 federal election with an outright majority, over six thousand votes ahead of Liberal challenger Robert Riopelle. Angus was the NDP parliamentary critic for Canadian Heritage from 2004 to 2007, and was additionally critic for agriculture from 2004 to 2006.

In 2005, his parish priest, Father John Lemire confronted him, and threatened to deny him Holy Communion if he voted with the government and his party to legalize same-sex marriage by Act of Parliament. Angus stood his ground and was denied communion. Angus' treatment provoked widespread public reaction both from those who supported the church's stance, and those who supported Angus.

He has worked extensively on community development projects with Canada's First Nations, working as a negotiator and consultant for the Algonquin Nation of Quebec. He also played a prominent role in calling national attention to the Kashechewan crisis of 2005.

In 2007 he became the critic for Public Works and Treasury Board, as well as the NDP spokesman for digital issues such as copyright and internet neutrality.

In 2006, after he had served just two years as a Member of Parliament, the Toronto Star selected Angus as one of the ten most effective opposition MPs. He also won "Best Constituent Representative" at the 2007 Maclean's Parliamentarian of the Year Awards. Angus was re-elected in the federal elections of both 2008 and the 2011. Angus also served as the party's spokesman on privacy, ethics and government accountability. Angus voted against a bill to abolish the Canadian Firearms Registry in September 2010. Although the registry is unpopular with many of his constituents, Angus voted against its abolition based on supportive studies provided by police. He subsequently introduced a private member's bill to reform the registry.

He was named to Maclean's magazine's Power List in 2012 as one of the 25 most influential Canadians. Zoomer Magazine has chosen him the third most influential Canadian over the age of 45. In 2011, CTV News Channel's Power Play chose him in the top three MPs of the year, along with the then Conservative Prime Minister, Stephen Harper, and NDP leader Jack Layton.

Angus has been an advocate for the rights of First Nations children and was the co-founder of the Shannen's Dream campaign – named in honour of the late Cree youth leader Shannen Koostachin. In early 2012, Angus' parliamentary motion "Shannen's Dream" calling for an end to the systemic under-funding of First Nation education passed unanimously through the House of Commons.

After the 2015 federal election, he was appointed NDP critic for Indigenous and Northern Affairs in the 42nd Canadian Parliament and elected Caucus Chair in January 2016. He was also a member of the Aboriginal Affairs and Northern Development committee. He resigned from both roles on November 23, 2016 in to prepare for the 2017 New Democratic Party leadership race.  On February 20, 2017, Angus officially registered to run in the NDP leadership race to replace Tom Mulcair. He placed second with 19.4% of the vote, losing to then Ontario provincial politician Jagmeet Singh.

Angus was re-elected in the 2019 and 2021 federal elections.

Works
 We Lived a Life and Then Some with Brit Griffin, Sally Lawrence, and Rob Moir. Between the Lines Books, 1996. .
 Industrial Cathedrals of the North, with Louie Palu and Marguerite Andersen. Between the Lines, 1999. .
 Mirrors of Stone: Fragments from the Porcupine Frontier, with Louie Palu. Between the Lines, 2001. .
 Les Costello: Canada's Flying Father. Novalis, 2005. .
 Cage Call, with Louie Palu. Photolucida, 2007. .
 Unlikely Radicals. Between the Lines, 2013. .
 Children of the Broken Treaty: Canada's Lost Promise and One Girl's Dream. University of Regina Press, 2015. .
 Cobalt: Cradle of the Demon Metals, Birth of a Mining Superpower, House of Anansi Press, 2022, ISBN 978-1487009496

Honours and awards 
Angus was selected as "Best Mentor" during Macleans 12th annual Parliamentarians of the Year award and was also the 2007 winner for "Best represents constituents". He was also a finalist for "Most knowledgeable".

Electoral record

References

External links
 
 How'd They Vote?: Charlie Angus's voting history and quotes
 

1962 births
21st-century Canadian politicians
Canadian country singer-songwriters
Canadian country rock musicians
Canadian environmentalists
Canadian folk rock musicians
20th-century Canadian historians
Canadian male non-fiction writers
Canadian magazine editors
Canadian Roman Catholics
Canadian folk singer-songwriters
Catholic Workers
Copyright activists
Living people
Members of the House of Commons of Canada from Ontario
Musicians from Toronto
New Democratic Party MPs
People from Cobalt, Ontario
Politicians from Toronto
Writers from Timmins
Writers from Toronto
Canadian male singer-songwriters
Ontario school board trustees
Musicians from Timmins